Vergil Patrick Hughes (born May 27, 1955) is an American sportscaster. He has been the radio play-by-play announcer for the Chicago Cubs of Major League Baseball (MLB) since 1996. The 2022 season marked the 40th consecutive year that Hughes served as an MLB announcer.

In recognition of his career, Hughes was awarded the 2023 Ford C. Frick Award.

Personal life

Born in Tucson, Arizona, Pat Hughes grew up in San Jose, California. He graduated from Branham High School in San Jose, California in 1973, and from San Jose State University in 1978 with a degree in Radio/TV Journalism.

Hughes has been married to his wife, Trish, since 1987. They have two daughters, Janell and Teddy Amber Guesa Hughes.

Broadcasting career

Hughes's MLB career began in 1983 performing as a TV play-by-play man for the Minnesota Twins, after which he spent 12 years in Milwaukee for the Brewers. Hughes also spent 17 years as a radio/TV game-caller for Marquette University basketball.

In November 1995, Pat Hughes was selected by WGN Radio in Chicago to be the new "Voice of the Cubs". Hughes partnered with color commentator Ron Santo, former Hall of Fame third baseman for the Cubs, from 1996 until Santo's death in 2010. Their on-air chemistry came to be known as the "Pat and Ron Show". In September 2003, he was the MC at Wrigley Field when the Cubs retired Ron Santo’s number at the last regular season game. After Ron Santo's death in 2010, former Cub Keith Moreland was Pat's partner on Cubs Radio for 3 seasons. In December 2013, another former Cub, and Chicago native, Ron Coomer joined Hughes.  The two called games on WGN Radio in 2014, switching to WBBM in 2015, and to WSCR-"The Score"-in 2016.  , the Hughes-Coomer Cubs Radio partnership was in its 9th season. Hughes has also worked regularly as an on-air partner with Harry Caray, Bob Uecker, and Al McGuire. 

In April 2018, Hughes broadcast his 6,000th Big League Baseball game.  This total includes Cactus League pre-season games, regular season, and post-season contests. After the end of the 2017 season, Hughes estimated that he had only missed five games for health reasons, despite undergoing three throat surgeries in the preceding years. 

His usual home run call is "That ball's got a chaaaance...GONE!" On longer home runs, Hughes' call often includes the phrase "Get out the tape measure, LONG GONE!".

Hughes has announced 57 Cubs postseason games, more than any other Cubs broadcaster and has called eight no-hitters in his career, comprising those tossed by Juan Nieves, Scott Erickson, Carlos Zambrano, Cole Hamels, Alec Mills and two by Jake Arrieta.

In addition to Major League Baseball and Marquette Basketball, Hughes has also covered games for the Minnesota North Stars of the NHL, Minor League baseball teams the Columbus Clippers and the San Jose Missions, both football and basketball games of the University of Wisconsin, and basketball games of Northwestern University.

Historic calls

One of Hughes' best known calls came at the end of the 2016 World Series, when the Cubs ended a 108-year World Series drought, the longest in baseball history:

He is also known for his call of Mark McGwire's 62nd home run in 1998, which broke the single-season home run record, which is the most often-played call of that moment:

Awards and honors

Hughes has been awarded several honors in recognition of his career, including repeated acknowledgement from the National Sportscasters and Sportswriters Association with nine Illinois Sportscaster of the Year awards (1996, 1999, 2006, 2007, 2009, 2014, 2015, 2017, 2019), and an additional three Wisconsin Sportscaster of the Year awards (1990–92). In 2016, Hughes received the Ring Lardner Award for Excellence in Sports Journalism, Broadcast category.

In addition to awards, Hughes has been inducted into the Hall of Fame of several organizations. In 2012, he was inducted into the Branham High School Athletic Hall of Fame. The broadcaster was inducted into the WGN Radio Walk of Fame in 2014, only the 3rd sportscaster to be honored. In 2017, Hughes was inducted into the Irish/American Baseball Hall of Fame in New York City.

On August 24, 2022, it was announced during a broadcast of the Cubs versus St. Louis that Hughes will be inducted into the Chicago Cubs Hall of Fame, with his plaque to be unveiled on September 10.

Frick Award
In 2016, Hughes was a finalist for the Ford C. Frick Award, in conjunction with the Baseball Hall of Fame in Cooperstown, New York. In 2022, he was again a finalist and was announced as the recipient in December, linking him with past fellow Cubs recipients Harry Caray and Jack Brickhouse.

Baseball Voices

Pat Hughes is the sole proprietor of "Baseball Voices", commemorative audio tributes to MLB's greatest announcers. On each CD, Pat performs as Producer, Writer, and Narrator.  Featured broadcasters include Hughes' former colleagues Harry Caray, Ron Santo and Bob Uecker, as well as Hall of Famers Mel Allen, Red Barber, Marty Brennaman, Jack Buck, Milo Hamilton, Harry Kalas, Denny Matthews, Dave Niehaus, Bob Prince, Chuck Thompson, Russ Hodges and Lon Simmons.  After the Cubs 2016 Championship, a Special Edition of Baseball Voices was created entitled "The Chicago Cubs Win the World Series!"

References

External links
WGN's Pat Hughes named 2006 Illinois Sportscaster of the Year 
 Pat Hughes Wins "Sportscaster of the Year" Award For Fifth Time
 Bio at Chicago Cubs web site
 
 Baseball Voices
 Pat Hughes Eulogy for Ron Santo

1955 births
Living people
American radio sports announcers
American television sports announcers
Chicago Cubs announcers
College basketball announcers in the United States
Ford C. Frick Award recipients
Major League Baseball broadcasters
Milwaukee Brewers announcers
Minnesota North Stars announcers
Minnesota Twins announcers
Minor League Baseball broadcasters
National Hockey League broadcasters
People from Tucson, Arizona
San Jose State University alumni